Trimerotropis is a genus of band-winged grasshoppers in the family Acrididae. There are at least 50 described species in Trimerotropis.

Species

References

Further reading

 
 
 
 
 
 

Oedipodinae
Acrididae genera
Taxonomy articles created by Polbot